The Sutter Buttes (Maidu: Histum Yani or Esto Yamani, Wintun: Olonai-Tol, Nisenan: Estom Yanim) are a small circular complex of eroded volcanic lava domes which rise as buttes above the flat plains of the Sacramento Valley in Sutter County, northern California. They are situated just outside Yuba City in the northern part of the state's Central Valley.

However, this title of the smallest mountain range is incorrect. At 1,477 peak height, that title would actually go to the Porcupine Mountains in the Upper Peninsula of Michigan in the United States. They are also older, at 2 Billion years old.

At the base of the mountain is the small town of Sutter. Both the town and the buttes are named for John Sutter, who received a large land grant in the area from the Mexican government.

Geography

Geology

The Sutter Buttes lie within the Central Valley of California.

They were formed about 1.6 million years ago in the early Pleistocene Epoch by volcanic activity.  They are the remnants of a volcano that has been dormant for about 1.4 million years. Some geological references suggest that the volcano represents the southernmost boundary of the Cascade Volcanoes, but there are significant differences in age and form compared to the other volcanoes in that range. Others suggest that its age places it with the volcanic elements of the California Coast Ranges; its composition is closer to that range but does have significant differences.

Exploration of natural gas leaks was first undertaken at South Butte by Dexter Cook in 1864, when he dug a  shaft. Buttes Oilfields, Inc., drilled a well in 1932, but it wasn't until June 1935 though that it drilled the first of four gas wells in the area of T. 15 N., R 1 E.

Soils and vegetation
The rugged central part of the Buttes has a stony, brown sandy loam of variable depth and good-to-somewhat-excessive drainage. The smoother perimeter has more variable soil, with clay or silt loam areas among the sandy loams. These soils support grassland or oak woodland.
The Sutter Buttes contain many species of flora and fauna. Wildflowers are represented by numerous taxa; included in these many wildflowers is the yellow mariposa lily, Calochortus luteus.

History

Indigenous era
The Sutter Buttes figure prominently in the creation stories and other traditions of the indigenous Nisenan, Maidu, and Wintun peoples. The Nisenan lived on the East side of the Buttes, while the Patwin Wintun lived on the West side.  The Nisenan name for the Buttes is Estom Yanim.  The Maidu name for the Sutter Buttes is Histum Yani (middle mountains of the Valley) or Esto Yamani, while the Wintun name for the Sutter Buttes is Onolai-Tol. All of these names roughly mean "The Middle Mountains".

There were seasonal encampments in the Buttes, and all these tribes visited the Buttes regularly to gather acorns and other foods or to hunt game. The Buttes were also a center of regional Native American religion. According to anthropologist Alfred Kroeber, the Patwin village where the city of Colusa now stands was the “hotbed” where the Kuksu Cult was established.  This religion spread through much of Northern California.  Ceremonies were performed in earthen dance lodges where spirit impersonators would re-enact ancient mythological events.

In the Maidu and Nisenan religions, the Sutter Buttes is the place where dying people came to ascend to the afterlife.

Spanish & Mexican periods
The Spaniard Gabriel Moraga was the first European to see the Sutter Buttes in 1806. In 1817, the Californio Luis Antonio Argüello named it "los tres picos" (the three peaks, name that appears on the Mexican land grant made to Captain John Sutter). In 1843, John C. Frémont called them "The Three Buttes." James Dwight Dana explored the buttes on 16 Oct. 1841, while part of the United States Exploring Expedition.  In June 1846, John C. Frémont, on a massacre spree since April, stopped at the Sutter Buttes. Fearing an attack from the local Indians, Frémont led a preemptive attack which killed many Indians and led the others to flee the area. It remains known as the Sutter Buttes massacre.

American period
Under the 1848 Treaty of Guadalupe Hildago at the end of the war with Mexico the United States acquired California. Under the treaty the United States agreed to respect titles conveyed by Mexico. John Sutter claimed ownership of the Sutter Buttes under his New Helvetia grant. The United States Land Commission and the courts determined that Sutter's New Helvetia Grant did not include the Buttes. No land title in the Buttes arises under a Spanish or Mexican Grant, all title to land in the Buttes derives from the federal government. During the Gold Rush, the Buttes were called the "Marysville Buttes". In 1920, the state of California failed to purchase the Marysville Buttes, which finally became the "Sutter Buttes" in 1949.

Howel Williams further investigated the geology of the buttes in 1929. Williams teamed up with Garniss Curtis in 1977 to include radiometric dating of the area.

In 2003, the California Department of Parks and Recreation purchased  in Peace Valley, on the north side of the Sutter Buttes, for $3 million with the intent to develop it as a state park. In 2005 the Parks Commission determined that the property would be a state park. The land was served by a road easement at the time it was purchased by the state. An underlying landowner sued asserting that the easement was insufficient to permit park visitor travel between Pennington Road and the park, and lost. The court determined that the easement was sufficient to allow visitor use. This land will continue to sit unused for the foreseeable future. The Parks agency has indicated that persons who can access the park from adjoining private lands may enter and use the park. The route crosses private lands and has not been prepared for regular public access.

Titan missile silos and U-2 crash 
Between 1960 and 1962, the US Air Force built a Titan 1 ICBM missile launch complex at the north side of the Sutter Buttes, the Pennington Missile Base. A part of the 851st Strategic Missile Squadron headquartered at nearby Beale Air Force Base, the site was designated "851-B." The companion 851-A and 851-C launch sites were located near Lincoln, California and Chico, California.  Designed by the United States Army Corps of Engineers to survive a nuclear attack, the Titan 1 complexes were the largest and most hardened of the first-generation ICBM facilities. The sites were composed of three underground missile silos interconnected to support and command bunkers by a network of tunnels. The facility was active between 1962 and 1965. In January 1965, the Titan 1 ICBM was phased out by the US Department of Defense. All missiles were removed from the site by February 1965.  The facilities were then decommissioned and the land subsequently sold back into private ownership.  The site has been host to many vandals and trespassers since the early 1980s to the present.

In September 2016, a US Air Force Lockheed U-2 from the 1st Reconnaissance Squadron crashed in the Sutter Buttes during a training mission, killing one of the two pilots.

Public access
Before 1960, the land was private, but accessible to the public. In 1960, a fire spread on the Buttes and the ranchers decided to close its access to the public. Since the state acquired some of the Buttes, it intends to redevelop its public access but the neighboring ranchers are highly hostile to that idea.
The state park land came with an easement running between the park and Pennington Road to the north. An underlying land owner sued the state asserting that the easement was not sufficient to allow park visitor use. The underlying landowner lost and the court determined that the state could permit visitor access to and from the park over the easement.

Public access to the Sutter Buttes is limited. Almost all of the land is privately held by ranchers and farmers, but an important exception is a  parcel encompassing most of North Butte, donated by deed from the McClatchy Company to the Sutter Buttes Regional Land Trust.
The terms of the deed of conveyance include the stipulation that the donated land be used for supervised public educational access, not for private use. The deed further stipulates that if these terms of conveyance are violated the land can revert to McClatchy ownership.
A few naturalists and local organizations, including Middle Mountain Interpretive Hikes,
and the Sutter County Historical Society,
lead hikes through some areas. Since 1929, the State of California had considered purchasing the land for protection and a state park.

Park Access
The State acquired access to the park property at the time it purchased the property. There are two basic theories supporting public access to the park: That the road is a dedicated public road, and that the road is on a road easement purchased by the owner of the park property from the owners of the burdened land.
The road running between the park and North Butte Road may be a public road by dedication.

All of the land in the Sutter Buttes became federal land under the 1848 Treaty of Guadalupe Hildago. Before this land was conveyed out of federal ownership it was surveyed and maps were prepared and adopted by the federal General Land Office. The survey notes and approved maps show a road running between what is now North Butte Road and the northwest corner of the park property before the land was conveyed out. Under the federal mining act of 1866, the federal government offered roads established on the federal land to the people. This offer could be and apparently was accepted by use. The road today is not in the exact place it was on the federal maps but is the functional equivalent and so appears to be a public road.

The purchased road easement
In 1928 T.J. Brady, then the owner of the property that became the park, purchased a road easement from Richard Campbell Sr. and Lee and Allie Ballard, then the owners of land between what became the park property and North Butte Road, to provide access to his property. Richard Campbell Jr. sued the state when the park was established, claiming that the existing easement was not sufficient to permit the state to allow park visitors to use the road. Campbell and his co-plaintiffs lost: The courts determined that the state could use the easement for visitor access to the park.

Gallery

See also

Sutter County, California
List of highest points in California by county
Sutter Buttes massacre

References

Sources

External links
 
 
 

Buttes of California
Locations in Native American mythology
Mountain ranges of Sutter County, California
Geography of the Sacramento Valley
Volcanoes of California
Extinct volcanoes
Pleistocene lava domes
Pleistocene California
John Sutter
Mountain ranges of Northern California